Monday Night Football with Peyton and Eli, colloquially known as the Manningcast, is an American alternate live television broadcast of Monday Night Football hosted by brothers Peyton and Eli Manning. It is produced by Peyton's production company Omaha Productions. The broadcasts air on ESPN2 and ESPN+.

History
On July 19, 2021, ESPN announced that Peyton and Eli Manning would host an alternate presentation of Monday Night Football. The deal signed by ESPN and Omaha Productions (which produced the ESPN+ series Peyton's Places) was for three seasons and called for ten games each year. For the 2021 season, it was announced that the presentation would air for the first three weeks of the season (Ravens-Raiders, Lions-Packers and Eagles-Cowboys), with the final seven telecasts announced at a later date.

The first Manningcast aired on September 13, 2021, as an alternate presentation of the Monday Night Football game between the Las Vegas Raiders and Baltimore Ravens.

On November 13, 2021, ESPN announced that the presentation would also be offered for the network's Monday-night Wild Card Game during the 2021 playoffs. In February 2022, ESPN extended its contract through the 2024 NFL season, with Omaha Productions also slated to collaborate with ESPN on extending the format to other sports properties, such as college football, golf, and UFC events. The series received a Sports Emmy Award for Outstanding Live Sports Series at the 43rd Sports Emmy Awards on May 24, 2022.

Episodes

Series overview

Season 1 (2021–2022)

Season 2 (2022–2023)

Curse
A "curse" akin to the Madden curse began to develop upon players who made guest appearances on the broadcasts, with an observed pattern of players having a decline in performance the following week.

Adoption by other ESPN properties 
Building upon the success of the Mannings' broadcasts, ESPN has since produced similar broadcasts for some of its other sports properties, some of which not involving the Mannings, but were still called Manningcasts:

 During the 2022 NCAA Women's Final Four, ESPN2 aired an alternate broadcast known as The Bird & Taurasi Show, featuring basketball players Sue Bird and Diana Taurasi.
 The "KayRod Cast" airs for selected Sunday Night Baseball games during the 2022 season, with Michael Kay and Alex Rodriguez. 
 Joe Buck and Michael Collins hosted a similar broadcast during each round of the 2022 PGA Championship, serving as the opening hour of coverage on ESPN before moving to ESPN2 (first and second rounds) or ESPN+ (third and final rounds) afterward. Joe Buck's long-time NFL commentary partner Troy Aikman, Charles Barkley, and the Mannings made guest appearances. The broadcasts marked Buck and Aikman's on-air debuts at ESPN, after moving from Fox Sports to serve as the new lead commentators for Monday Night Football (from 2015 to mid-2020, Buck served as the lead commentator for Fox's broadcasts of USGA tournaments). It was the first iteration of the format outside of Monday Night Football that was produced by Omaha.
 In August 2022, it was announced that that the Mannings would produce alternate broadcasts for six college football games on ESPN2, with Pat McAfee as host.

Reception 
The format, as well as the brothers' chemistry, have received critical acclaim.

The Peyton & Eli broadcasts were parodied in the cold opening of Saturday Night Lives 48th season premiere on October 1, 2022, which portrayed the Mannings (played by host Miles Teller, and Andrew Dismukes respectively) commentating over a sketch themed around the FBI search of Donald Trump's Mar-a-Lago home, with self-deprecating remarks acknowledging the major changes in cast which took effect that season.

Accolades

References

2021 American television series debuts
American sports television series
English-language television shows
ESPN original programming